James William Hadley (12 June 1893 – 16 July 1971) was an Australian politician. Born in Brisbane, he received a primary education before becoming a timber worker, after which he worked with the railways. He was also an organiser with the Australian Workers' Union. In 1943, he was elected to the Australian House of Representatives as the Labor member for Lilley, defeating the sitting United Australia Party member, William Jolly. He held the seat until his defeat by the Liberal candidate in 1949. In 1956, he was elected to the Legislative Assembly of Queensland as the member for Nundah, but he was defeated the following year, having defected to the Queensland Labor Party. Hadley died in 1971 and was buried in Nudgee Cemetery.

References

Australian Labor Party members of the Parliament of Australia
Queensland Labor Party members of the Parliament of Queensland
Members of the Australian House of Representatives for Lilley
Members of the Australian House of Representatives
Members of the Queensland Legislative Assembly
1893 births
1971 deaths
Burials at Nudgee Cemetery
20th-century Australian politicians